Claire Swift (born June 9, 1974) is an American Republican Party politician who has represented 2nd Legislative District in the New Jersey General Assembly since taking office on January 11, 2022.

Early life and education
A 1992 graduate of Atlantic City High School, Swift earned her undergraduate degree in 1996 from the University of Pennsylvania and was granted a degree in law from Widener University Delaware Law School in 1999. She was a Deputy Attorney General in New Jersey until 2003, when she joined her family law firm.

Elective office
Together with her running mates incumbent Senator Vincent J. Polistina and former Atlantic City Mayor Don Guardian, Swift was elected in a Republican sweep of the district that flipped both Assembly seats from the Democrats.

Swift was one of a record seven new Republican Assemblywomen elected in the 2022 general election, joining seven Republican women incumbents who won re-election that year.

Committees 
Committee assignments for the current session are:
Human Services
Labor
Law and Public Safety

District 2 
Each of the 40 districts in the New Jersey Legislature has one representative in the New Jersey Senate and two members in the New Jersey General Assembly. The representatives from the 2nd District for the 2022—23 Legislative Session are:
Senator Vincent J. Polistina (R)
Assemblyman Don Guardian (R)
Assemblyman Claire Swift (R)

References

External links
 Legislative webpage

Living people
1974 births
Atlantic City High School alumni
New Jersey lawyers
Republican Party members of the New Jersey General Assembly
People from Margate City, New Jersey
Politicians from Atlantic County, New Jersey
University of Pennsylvania alumni
Widener University School of Law alumni
Women state legislators in New Jersey
21st-century American politicians
21st-century American women politicians